The Symphony No. 1 by Arnold Bax was completed in 1922 and dedicated to John Ireland. Its outer movements were based on a Piano Sonata in E♭ that Bax subsequently orchestrated, while the central movement was newly composed for the symphony.

It is scored for 4 flutes (3rd doubling alto flute, 4th doubling piccolo), 2 oboes, 1 English horn, 1 heckelphone or bass oboe, 3 clarinets (3rd doubling E♭ clarinet), 1 bass clarinet, 2 bassoons, 1 sarrusophone or contrabassoon, 4 horns, 3 trumpets, 3 trombones, 1 tuba, timpani, bass drum, tenor drum, snare drum, tambourine, cymbals, gong, triangle, bells, xylophone, glockenspiel, celesta, 2 harps and strings.

It is in three movements:

Allegro moderato e feroce - Moderato expressivo - Tempo I
Lento solenne
Allegro maestoso - Allegro vivace ma non troppo

The work is in many ways autobiographical with some music critics suggesting they could find references within the work to the Great War.

References

External links
 

Symphonies by Arnold Bax
1922 compositions
Compositions in E-flat major
Music dedicated to family or friends